Ardisia antonensis is a species of plant in the family Primulaceae. It is endemic to Panama.

References

Endemic flora of Panama
antonensis
Data deficient plants
Taxonomy articles created by Polbot